Lathyrus annuus, the annual vetchling, is a species of annual herb in the family Fabaceae. They are climbers and are associated with freshwater habitat. They have broad leaves. Individuals can grow to 37 cm tall.

Sources

References 

annuus
Flora of Malta